Joseph Peter Clark (22 January 1938–2008) was an English professional footballer who played in the Football League for Crewe Alexandra, Doncaster Rovers, Mansfield Town and Stockport County.

References

1938 births
2008 deaths
English footballers
Association football midfielders
English Football League players
Wolverhampton Wanderers F.C. players
Mansfield Town F.C. players
Doncaster Rovers F.C. players
Hednesford Town F.C. players
Stourbridge F.C. players
Hereford United F.C. players
Stockport County F.C. players
Crewe Alexandra F.C. players
New Brighton A.F.C. players